The men's 82.5 kg weightlifting competitions at the 1988 Summer Olympics in Seoul took place on 24 September at the Olympic Weightlifting Gymnasium. It was the sixteenth appearance of the light heavyweight class.

Results

References

Weightlifting at the 1988 Summer Olympics